Klainedoxa is a group of African trees in the family Irvingiaceae, described as a genus in 1896. It is native to Africa.

Species
Klainedoxa gabonensis Pierre - W + C Africa from Senegal to South Sudan + Tanzania south to Angola
Klainedoxa trillesii Pierre ex Tiegh. - from Ivory Coast to Zaire

References

External links

Irvingiaceae
Malpighiales genera